This is a list of commercial video games with available source code. The source code of these commercially developed and distributed video games is available to the public or the games' communities.

In several of the cases listed here, the game's developers released the source code expressly to prevent their work from becoming abandonware. Such source code is often released under varying (free and non-free, commercial and non-commercial) software licenses to the games' communities or the public; artwork and data are often released under a different license than the source code, as the copyright situation is different or more complicated. The source code may be pushed by the developers to public repositories (e.g. SourceForge or GitHub), or given to selected game community members, or sold with the game, or become available by other means. The game may be written in an interpreted language such as BASIC or Python, and distributed as raw source code without being compiled; early software was often distributed in text form, as in the book BASIC Computer Games. In some cases when a game's source code is not available by other means, the game's community "reconstructs" source code from compiled binary files through time-demanding reverse engineering techniques.

Games with source code available on release

Games with later released source code

Games with available source code 
The table below with available source code resulted not from official releases by companies or IP holders but from unclear release situations, like lost & found and leaks of unclear legality (e.g. by an individual developer on end-of-product-life) or undeleted content.

Games with reconstructed source code 

Once games, or software in general, become an obsolete product for a company, the tools and source code required to re-create the game are often lost or even actively destroyed and deleted. For instance, with the closure of Atari in Sunnyvale, California in 1996, the original source codes of several milestones of video game history such as Asteroids and Centipede were all thrown out as trash.

When much time and manual work is invested, it is still possible to recover or restore a source code variant which replicates the program's functions accurately from the binary program. Techniques used to accomplish this are decompiling, disassembling, and reverse engineering the binary executable. This approach typically does not result in the exact original source code but rather a divergent version, as a binary program does not contain all of the information originally carried in the source code. For example, comments and function names cannot be restored if the program was compiled without additional debug information.

Using the techniques listed above within a "bottom-up" development methodology process, the re-created source-code of a game is able to replicate the behavior of the original game exactly, often being "clock-cycle accurate", and/or "pixel-per-pixel accurate".  This approach is in contrast to that used by game engine recreations, which are often made using a "top-down" development methodology, and which can result in duplicating the general features provided by a game engine, but not necessarily an accurate representation of the original game.

See also

 :Category:Commercial video games with freely available source code.
 List of open-source game engines
 List of open-source video games
 List of formerly proprietary software
 List of commercial video games released as freeware
 List of freeware games
 List of proprietary source-available software
 Source port
 Source-available software

References

External links

 Game Source Code Collection at the Internet Archive

Video game lists by license
 
Video games